"The Part of Me That Needs You Most" is a 1979 song performed by the group Exile. It was written by Mike Chapman and Nicky Chinn. The song was included on the band's album All There Is, and it was the second of three singles released from the LP.

Also known as "The Part of Me", the song was a major hit in South Africa, where it reached number two.  It also charted in New Zealand, where it reached number 10.

Jay Black version 
In 1980, Jay Black (the former lead singer of the band Jay and the Americans) released his own version of "The Part of Me That Needs You Most", produced by Joel Diamond for Silver Blue Productions Ltd. The song spent four weeks on the Billboard Hot 100, peaking at number 98 in September 1980.

B.J. Thomas cover 
In 1985, B. J. Thomas covered "The Part of Me That Needs You Most". His version became a hit on the country charts, reaching number 61 in the U.S., and number 57 in Canada.

Chart history

Weekly charts 
Exile

Jay Black cover

B.J. Thomas cover

Year-end charts

References

External links 
 Lyrics of this song
 
 
 

1979 songs
1979 singles
1981 singles
1985 singles
Exile (American band) songs
B. J. Thomas songs
Songs written by Mike Chapman
Song recordings produced by Mike Chapman
Songs written by Nicky Chinn
Warner Records singles